Cheetham is an inner-city area and electoral ward of Manchester, England, which in 2011 had a population of 22,562.
close to the boundary with Salford, bounded by Broughton to the north, Harpurhey to the east, and Piccadilly and Deansgate to the south.

Historically part of Lancashire, Cheetham was a township in the parish of Manchester and hundred of Salford. The township was amalgamated into the Borough of Manchester in 1838, and in 1896 became part of the North Manchester township.

Cheetham is home to a multi-ethnic community, a result of several waves of immigration to Britain. In the mid-19th century, it attracted Irish people fleeing the Great Famine. It is now home to the Irish World Heritage Centre. Jews settled in the late-19th and early-20th centuries, fleeing persecution in continental Europe. Migrants from the Indian subcontinent and Caribbean settled in the 1950s and 1960s, and more recently people from Africa, Eastern Europe and the Far East.

Heavily urbanised following the Industrial Revolution, Cheetham is bisected by Cheetham Hill Road, which is lined with churches, mosques, synagogues and temples, as well as terraced houses dating from its history as a textile processing district. Markets along the road trade in wares and foodstuffs from all over the world. The Museum of Transport in Manchester in Boyle Street, Cheetham Hill, is part of Queen's Road bus depot.

History

Neolithic implements have been discovered at Cheetham Hill, implying human habitation 7–10,000 years ago.

Though Cheetham is not mentioned in the Domesday Book of 1086 and does not appear in records until 1212, when it was documented to have been a thegnage estate comprising "a plough-land", with an annual rate of 1 mark payable by the tenant, Roger de Middleton, to King John of England. From the Middletons the estate of Cheetham passed to other families, including the Chethams and Pilkingtons.

The Roman Catholic church of St Chad was opened in 1847. The Anglican churches as of 1955 were St Mark's (1794), St Luke's (1839), St John Evangelist's (Paley & Austin, 1871), St Alban's (J. S. Crowther); at that time there was also a Presbyterian chapel and nine synagogues. St Mark's Church was built in 1794; in 1855 the chancel was enlarged and in 1894 a tower was added. St Luke's Church is in a Victorian variant of the Perpendicular style. St John Evangelist's was designed by Paley & Austin and built at the expense of Lewis Loyd. St Alban's (1857–64) was designed by J. S. Crowther in a Gothic revival style influenced by French Gothic and is a good example of his work. The synagogues of Cheetham included the Central Synagogue (1927–28), a synagogue which was originally a Methodist chapel (in the neo-Classical style), the Great Synagogue (built of stone and brick in 1857), the New Synagogue (1889) and the United Synagogue which was originally a Roman Catholic chapel. The New Synagogue was known as the Spanish and Portuguese Jews' Synagogue and after a period of disuse was converted into the Manchester Jewish Museum. By the early 20th century, the southern end of Cheetham had a large Jewish population, and nine synagogues.

Joseph Holt's Brewery was established on Empire Street, Cheetham in 1860. Michael Marks was a Jewish immigrant who lived in Cheetham Hill with his family. He and Thomas Spencer opened the first Marks and Spencer store on Cheetham Hill Road in 1893. The business grew considerably over following years and in 1901 the company's first headquarters was built on Derby Street.

During the Madchester phase of the history of Manchester, narcotic trade in the city became "extremely lucrative" and in the early 1980s a gang war started between two groups vying for control of the market in Manchester city centre – the Cheetham Hill Gang and The Gooch Close Gang, in Cheetham Hill and Moss Side respectively.

Governance

Lying within the historic county boundaries of Lancashire since the early 12th century, Cheetham anciently constituted a thegnage estate, held by tenants who paid tax to the King. Cheetham during the Middle Ages formed a township in the parish of Manchester, and hundred of Salford. Governance continued on this basis until the Industrial Revolution, when Cheetham and the neighbouring Manchester Township had become sufficiently urbanised and integrated to warrant an amalgamation into a single district: the then Borough of Manchester, in 1838. There was a Cheetham Committee of Manchester Borough Council until 1875. Cheetham continued to hold the status of a township until 1896, when, together with Beswick, Blackley, Bradford, Clayton, Crumpsall, Harpurhey, Moston and Newton, it became part of the township of North Manchester. North Manchester was a part of the City and County Borough of Manchester.

Following the Poor Law Amendment Act 1834, Cheetham formed part of the Manchester Poor Law Union from 1841 to 1850, Prestwich Poor Law Union from 1850 to 1915, and returned to Manchester Poor Law Union in 1915 until 1930. These were inter-parish units established to provide social security.

Cheetham is an electoral ward of Manchester City Council, and is part of the Blackley and Broughton parliamentary constituency. Blackley and Broughton is a new constituency created in 2010, replacing the former Manchester Blackley constituency, of which the Cheetham Hill area was also included in. The current MP is Graham Stringer of the Labour Party, first representing Manchester Blackley since 1997 and now Blackley and Broughton. Winston Churchill was Liberal MP for the area early in his political career (some years before he re-crossed the floor to the Conservative Party).

Councillors 
Three councillors serve the ward: Shazia Butt (Lab), Shaukat Ali (Lab), and Naeem Hassam (Lab).

 indicates seat up for re-election.

Geography

To the north, it is bordered by Crumpsall, to the west by Broughton in Salford, to the east and the southeast by Harpurhey and Collyhurst, and by Manchester City Centre to the south.

Cheetham Hill lies on "rising ground" and is completely urbanised.

Demography

The ward had a population of 22,562 at the 2011 census. Its population accounted for 4.2% of the city of Manchester's in 2010. In November 2011, 68.5% of residential properties were classified as private, while 31.5% were classified as social housing. House prices remain below the Manchester average.

Notable people

Don Arden — music promoter and manager of the Small Faces, ELO (born Harry Levy), father of Sharon Osbourne was born in Cheetham Hill
Jon Ashworth, Labour Party politician, spent three childhood years in Cheetham Hill
 Frances Hodgson Burnett —author of The Secret Garden and A Little Princess was born in Cheetham
 Sandra Douglas — athlete, a member of the Olympic 4 x 400 metre bronze medal winning team in Barcelona 1992
 Efan Ekoku — former Premier League and Nigeria striker, was born in Cheetham Hill
Jessie Fothergill (1851–1891), novelist, was born in Cheetham Hill
Sir Edward Holt, 1st Baronet — brewer
 Abraham Hyman — survivor of the Titanic liner disaster, opened a delicatessen in Cheetham Hill, where it remains to this day
 Howard Jacobson — author, was born and raised in Cheetham Hill
 George Augustus Lee (1761–1826), industrialist, lived in Cheetham Hill
 Bugzy Malone — grime artist
 Lois Maynard — footballer for FC Halifax Town.
 Jack Rosenthal — playwright, known for The Evacuees, Bar Mitzvah Boy and early episodes of Coronation Street
 Benny Rothman — political activist, famous for taking part in the Mass trespass of Kinder Scout in Derbyshire
 J. J. Thomson — English physicist who discovered the electron and won the Nobel Prize in Physics was born in Cheetham Hill

See also

Listed buildings in Manchester-M8
Manchester Jewish Museum

References

Works cited
 
 

Areas of Manchester
Manchester City Council Wards